Bill Courtney (born May 4, 1970) is an American college basketball coach who is currently the Associate Head Coach at Miami (FL) in Coral Gables, Florida and the former head men's basketball coach at Cornell.

Coaching career

Head coach
On April 23, 2010, following the resignation of former head coach Steve Donahue, a press conference was held at Cornell University to officially hire Courtney as the next basketball coach. Courtney thanked Donahue for leading the University to three consecutive Ivy League titles, and mentioned that his first goal was to win a fourth. He also mentioned that while “no one thinks we're going to be that good next year," he told the team to "put no limits on what they can accomplish because [Courtney] certainly won't."  Courtney's official title is Robert E. Gallagher '44 Head Coach of Cornell Men's Basketball.

After six seasons as a head coach and compiling a losing record, Courtney's contract was not renewed in March 2016.

Courtney was hired by DePaul as an assistant coach on June 28, 2017.

After two seasons serving as an assistant coach at DePaul, Cortney was hired by Miami (FL) on June 12, 2019.

Head coaching record

References

External links
 Cornell profile

1970 births
Living people
American men's basketball coaches
Bowling Green Falcons men's basketball coaches
Bucknell Bison men's basketball players
College men's basketball head coaches in the United States
Cornell Big Red men's basketball coaches
George Mason Patriots men's basketball coaches
Place of birth missing (living people)
Providence Friars men's basketball coaches
Virginia Cavaliers men's basketball coaches
Virginia Tech Hokies men's basketball coaches
American men's basketball players